Pinwheel may refer to:

 Pinwheel (toy), a spinning children's toy
 Pinwheel (cryptography), a device for producing a short pseudo-random sequence of bits
 Pinwheel (shogi), an opening in the game shogi or Japanese chess
 Pinwheel (TV channel), a channel which would later turn into Nickelodeon
 Pinwheel (TV series), a children's show on Nickelodeon that ran from 1977 to 1984
 Pinwheel calculator (part of), a type of early mechanical arithmetic machine
 Tabernaemontana divaricata, also known as pinwheel flower
 Pinwheel tilings, aperiodic tilings of the plane whose tiles appear in infinitely many orientations
 Catherine wheel (firework), a form of pyrotechnic display device also known as a pinwheel
 Coenocharopa elegans, also known as the elegant pinwheel snail, a land snail found in Queensland, Australia
 "Pinwheels", a poem by Patti Smith from her 1978 book Babel
 Pinwheel USY, part of United Synagogue Youth covering the Pacific Northwest
 Wartenberg wheel, a neurological medical device

See also 
 
 Pinwheel Galaxy (disambiguation)
 Pinwheel escapement (disambiguation)